Hamboki is a large village, in Tehsil Nowshera Virkan, Punjab, Pakistan. It is situated 33 km west from Gujranwala. Village is very popular due to its regional advancement.

Geography
Village is located in the west of district Gujranwala, on Nokhar to Alipur road. It is direct connect to nearly town Qila Didar Singh. Its coordinates are 31.6896° N, 75.2377°E.

 East : Philloki, Nurpur
 West : Badoki Saikhwan, Udhowali
 South : Nokhar
 North: Bakhshish Pura

History

In 18th century, village was a part of late destroyed city Maka. Now Maka is also a small village, Makewali and Hamboki is a separated village having much population. Peoples are confused by the origin of name Hamboki.

There are some buildings having origin from British Rule.

Education

The education system of Village is good but literacy rate is very low. There are many Public and Private institutes in village. The literacy rate is about 59%.

Schools
 Govt. Elementary School, Hamboki

 Govt. Primary School Hamboki.
 Alfatah Academy
 Rahman Public School
 Subhan Ideal School System

Facilities

All streets of Village are well paved. Gas and Electricity are available. Some private health center working. There is no Rural Health Centre in village.
There are two petrol pumps in village. All kinds of groceries, home goods and editable things are available.

Economy 
The Economy of Village is normal. GDP per capita is 20000 PKR. Agriculture is one of main occupation of villagers.

Nearby villages
 Udhowali
 Badoki Saikhwan
 Nokhar
 Philloki

See also

 Badoki Saikhwan
 Udhowali
 Nokhar
 Qila Didar Singh

References

Villages in Gujranwala District